Vincenzo Marra (born Naples, 18 September 1972) is an Italian filmmaker.

Filmography
 2001 - Tornando a casa
 2002 - E.A.M. - Estranei alla massa (documentary)
 2003 - Paesaggio a sud
 2004 - Vento di terra
 2005 - 58% (documentary)
 2006 - L'udienza è aperta (documentary)
 2007 - The Trial Begins
 2014 - Bridges of Sarajevo
 2015 - First Light

References

External links

Italian film directors
Living people
Film people from Naples
Italian screenwriters
Italian male screenwriters
1972 births